Argas keiransi is a species of argasid tick in the subgenus Persicargus that parasitizes the chimango, a falconid bird of prey found in the Sub-Antarctic biogeographical region; the type species was collected in Chillán, Chile.<ref name="EVGG2003">{{cite journal | last1 = Estrada-Peña | first1 = A | last2 = Venzal | first2 = JM | last3 = González-Acuña | first3 = D | last4 = Guglielmone | first4 = AA | date = Nov 2003 | title = Argas (Persicargas) keiransi n. sp. (Acari: Argasidae), a parasite of the Chimango, Milvago c. chimango (Aves: Falconiformes) in Chile | journal = J Med Entomol | volume = 40 | issue = 6| pages = 766–9 | pmid = 14765651 | doi=10.1603/0022-2585-40.6.766| s2cid = 9306613 }}</ref>  The species name honors the scientific contributions of James E. Keirans.  A. keiransi is similar to, but morphologically distinct from, Argas giganteus'' Kohls & Clifford, 1968.

References

Ticks
Animals described in 2003
Arachnids of South America
Argasidae
Parasites of birds